Erdal Church is a parish church of the Church of Norway in Askøy Municipality in Vestland county, Norway. It is located in the village of Erdal. It is the church for the Erdal parish which is part of the Vesthordland prosti (deanery) in the Diocese of Bjørgvin. The concrete and glass church was built in a long church design in 1995 using plans drawn up by the architect Jostein Tveit. The church seats about 500 people.

History
The church was built in 1995 by the architect Jostein Tveit. The original church was small (seating about 160 people) and it was meant to be an interim church that could be used while funds were raised and plans made for expanding the building to a full church. The interim church was consecrated on 12 February 1995 by the Bishop Ole D. Hagesæther. In 2006, the church addition was completed, vastly expanding the building. The new addition was consecrated on 3 September 2006.

Media gallery

See also
List of churches in Bjørgvin

References

Askøy
Churches in Vestland
Long churches in Norway
Concrete churches in Norway
20th-century Church of Norway church buildings
Churches completed in 1995
1995 establishments in Norway